"Heaven Help My Heart" is a song originally recorded by Australian singer and songwriter Tina Arena. It was written in 1994 by Arena with David Tyson and Dean McTaggart and released as the third single from Arena's second album, Don't Ask (1994). The song reached number 22 in her native Australia, and was a top 40 hit in the United Kingdom and New Zealand. Arena performed the single on the British children's television series Fully Booked on 5 August 1995.

Critical reception
Paul Verna from Billboard viewed the song as a "perky number". Pan-European magazine Music & Media wrote, "Arena knows how to chain herself to radio. Bass guitar forms the stable base for a solid piece of FM pop rock. Walking exactly in the middle of the road, she takes the shortest way to your heart." A reviewer from Music Week gave the song four out of five, adding, "Sony's regional radio pluggers will have plenty of takers for this soft rock follow-up to Chains, although it doesn't hit quite the same spot."

Charts

Certifications

Release history

Wynona Judd version

In 1996, American country music singer Wynonna Judd covered the song for her album Revelations. Her cover version went to number 14 on the US Hot Country Songs chart and number five on the Canadian RPM Country Tracks chart.

Charts

Weekly charts

Year-end charts

References

1994 songs
1995 singles
1996 singles
Columbia Records singles
Curb Records singles
MCA Records singles
Song recordings produced by Tony Brown (record producer)
Songs written by David Tyson
Songs written by Dean McTaggart
Songs written by Tina Arena
Tina Arena songs
Wynonna Judd songs